C. J. Wallace may refer to:
 C. J. Wallace (American football) (born 1985), American football player
 C. J. Wallace (actor) (born 1996), American actor and rapper
 Judson Wallace (born 1982), American basketball player also known as C. J. Wallace